Joshua Daniel Wright (born January 20, 1977) is an American economist and legal scholar who served as a commissioner of the Federal Trade Commission (FTC) from 2013 to 2015.  He has been a professor of law at George Mason University's Antonin Scalia Law School since 2004, and is the executive director of its Global Antitrust Institute. At the time of his nomination, Wright was the fourth economist to serve as a commissioner of the FTC.

Wright is a leading scholar in the fields of antitrust law,  law and economics, and consumer protection, and was described in National Review to be "widely considered his generation's greatest mind on antitrust law." He has published more than 100 articles and book chapters, co-authored a leading casebook, and edited several book volumes in these fields.  Wright has served as co-editor of the Supreme Court Economic Review and  senior editor of the Antitrust Law Journal, and in 2014 received the Paul M. Bator Award.

Early life and education
Wright was born and raised in San Diego, California. After graduating from Patrick Henry High School in 1995, Wright studied economics at the University of California, San Diego, graduating in 1998 with a Bachelor of Arts with highest departmental honors. He then went to the University of California, Los Angeles (UCLA), where he jointly did doctoral study in economics and attended the UCLA School of Law. He received a J.D. in 2002 and a Ph.D. in economics in 2003. As a law student, Wright was a managing editor of the UCLA Law Review.

Career
Wright was a law clerk for Judge James V. Selna of the U.S. District Court for the Central District of California from 2003 to 2004. He then joined the faculty of the George Mason University Law School (now Antonin Scalia Law School). Wright served in the Federal Trade Commission (FTC) in the Bureau of Competition as its inaugural Scholar-in-Residence from 2007 to 2008, where he focused on enforcement matters and competition policy. 

In January 2013, President Barack Obama appointed Wright to serve as a commissioner of the FTC. Wright served as an FTC commissioner until August 2015, when he resigned to return to academia. Wright is currently University Professor of Law at the Scalia Law School and the executive director of its Global Antitrust Institute.

Wright favors maintaining the status quo in current U.S. antitrust law. Several large technology companies have donated to Wright's academic center at the Scalia Law School.

See also 
 List of former FTC commissioners

References

External links

Living people
Federal Trade Commission personnel
University of California, San Diego alumni
University of California, Los Angeles alumni
George Mason University School of Law faculty
Pepperdine University faculty
People from San Diego
Scholars of competition law
UCLA School of Law alumni
1977 births
Obama administration personnel